Kamin-Kashyrskyi Raion is a raion in Volyn Oblast in western Ukraine. Its administrative center is the town of Kamin-Kashyrskyi. Population: 

On 18 July 2020, as part of the administrative reform of Ukraine, the number of raions of Volyn Oblast was reduced to four, and the area of Kamin-Kashyrskyi Raion was significantly expanded.  The January 2020 estimate of the raion population was

See also
 Administrative divisions of Volyn Oblast

References

External links
 kamadm.gov.ua 

Raions of Volyn Oblast
1940 establishments in Ukraine